Love Hill is an unincorporated community in Houston County, Alabama, United States.

References

Unincorporated communities in Houston County, Alabama
Unincorporated communities in Alabama